Sonaimuri Model High School is a secondary school located in Sonaimuri town, the administrative headquarters of Sonaimuri Upazila, Noakhali District, Bangladesh.

References

Schools in Noakhali District
Sonaimuri Upazila